The North Patagonian Batholith is a series of igneous plutons in the Patagonian Andes of Argentina and Chile.

Geology
The Northern Patagonian Batholith was formed in the Mesozoic  Era and Cenozoic Era. It is made up of a collection of individual plutons made up of granodiorite, tonalite and diorite among other rocks. 

Most plutons of the North Patagonian Batholith are of Cretaceous Period to the Miocene age of the Neogene Period (135 Ma to 25-15 Ma), during the Mesozoic  Era. Late Miocene to early Pliocene (10 to 5 Ma) leucogranites were also intruded. The Tertiary intrusions are centered on the strike-slip Liquine-Ofqui fault zone and include some gabbro bodies.

See also

References

Geology of the Andes
Batholiths of South America
Lithodemic units of Argentina
Lithodemic units of Chile
Cretaceous System of South America
Miocene Series of South America
Paleogene System of South America
Geology of Araucanía Region
Geology of Aysén Region
Geology of Los Ríos Region
Geology of Los Lagos Region
Cretaceous magmatism
Neogene magmatism